Kunín (until 1947 Kunvald) is a municipality and village in Nový Jičín District in the Moravian-Silesian Region of the Czech Republic. It has about 1,800 inhabitants.

Geography
Kunín lies on the Jičínka river. The larger part of the municipality is located in the Moravian Gate, the southeastern part is located in the Moravian-Silesian Foothills.

History
The first written mention of Kunvald is from 1382. Kunín was called Kunvald till 1947 when renamed. From 1975 to 1990, Kunín was an administrative part of Nový Jičín. Since 1991, it has been a separate municipality.

Economy
The municipality is connected with a significant dairy company Mlékárna Kunín. The production started here at the end of the 19th century. In 2004 the production was moved to Ostrava while the headquarters stayed here. Since 2007 the company is owned by Lactalis corporation.

Notable people
Anna Nitschmann (1715–1760), poet and Moravian Church missionary

Twin towns – sister cities

Kunín is twinned with:
 Leimen, Germany

References

External links

Villages in Nový Jičín District